Hirsutotriplax is a genus of pleasing fungus beetles in the family Erotylidae. There is one described species in Hirsutotriplax, H. mcclevei.

References

Further reading

 
 
 

Erotylidae
Articles created by Qbugbot